KTWH-LP is a Variety formatted broadcast radio station licensed to and serving Two Harbors, Minnesota.  KTWH-LP is owned and operated by Two Harbors Community Radio.

References

External links
 Two Harbors Community Radio Online
 

2015 establishments in Minnesota
Variety radio stations in the United States
Radio stations established in 2015
Radio stations in Minnesota
Low-power FM radio stations in Minnesota